Manibhai Ramjibhai Chaudhary (born 1 October 1947) is an Indian politician belonging to the Bharatiya Janata Party. He was a member of the Lok Sabha, the lower house of the Indian Parliament from Bulsar constituency in Gujarat in 1996, 1998 and 1999. He was earlier a member of the Gujarat Legislative assembly from Dharampur.

References

External links
 Official biographical sketch in Parliament of India website

1947 births
India MPs 1996–1997
India MPs 1998–1999
India MPs 1999–2004
Bharatiya Janata Party politicians from Gujarat
Lok Sabha members from Gujarat
People from Valsad district
Living people
Gujarat MLAs 1995–1998